Longguo & Shihyun (Hangul: 용국 & 시현) is a South Korean duo formed by Choon Entertainment in Seoul, South Korea. The duo previously participated in Produce 101 Season 2. They debuted on July 31, 2017, with the single "the.the.the". Longguo was a member of fan-made project boy group JBJ, having signed a seven-month contract with the label Fave Entertainment.

Members
 Longguo (용국)
 Shihyun (시현)

Discography

Extended plays

Singles

Awards and nominations

Golden Disc Awards

|-
| rowspan="2"|2018
| rowspan="2"|Longguo & Shihyun
|New Artist of the Year
| 
|-
| Global Popularity Award
|

References

K-pop music groups
South Korean musical duos
South Korean dance music groups
South Korean boy bands
Musical groups from Seoul
Musical groups established in 2017
2017 establishments in South Korea
South Korean pop music groups
Produce 101
Produce 101 contestants
Choon Entertainment artists